Nicholas Anthony Montgomery (born 28 October 1981) is a former professional footballer and current manager of A-League team Central Coast Mariners.

A defensive midfielder, Montgomery spent the majority of his career with Sheffield United, making 398 appearances across twelve seasons. Towards the end of his time in England, he had a short spell on loan with Millwall. In 2012, he moved to Australia to play for Central Coast Mariners, and became club captain in 2015. After leaving the Mariners in 2017, he went on to play for Wollongong Wolves for two seasons.

Born in England, Montgomery represented Scotland at under-21 level and as part of a Scotland 'Futures' side. He obtained Australian citizenship in 2017.

Club career

Sheffield United
Montgomery was born in Leeds, England. He supported Leeds United as a child and was at Leeds United's Academy for six years. He then was offered a two-year scholarship at Sheffield United. He made his first team début for the Blades at Carrow Road against Norwich City on 21 October 2000. He subsequently established himself as a regular in the first-team where he became a mainstay of central midfield for the Blades. Montgomery had to wait until November 2001 before he scored his first goal for the club, coming in a 4–0 home victory over Birmingham City.

Montgomery was an integral member of the 2005–06 squad that saw the Blades being promoted back to the Premier League. As a result of his hard work over the season, he was runner-up to Phil Jagielka in the club's Player of Year awards.

During the 2009–10 season Montgomery played a main role in an injury plagued Sheffield United squad eventually winning player of the season, including scoring his first league goal for four seasons in the Blades 3–0 home victory against Blackpool in March 2010. With the club looking to reduce their wage bill, a few months of speculation followed as to whether he would leave United but he eventually signed a new 3-year deal in June that year after reportedly turning down an approach from Yorkshire rivals Leeds United, despite being a lifelong Leeds fan.

For the 2011–2012 season the Blades found themselves in the third tier of English football for the first time in over 20 years and Montgomery found himself out of the first team picture for the first time in his United career. Losing his place in midfield to Michael Doyle he was confined to occasional substitute appearances as the season progressed. With first team opportunities limited Montgomery joined Championship team Millwall on loan in March 2012, agreeing a deal to remain there until the end of the season. However at the end of the month Montgomery's loan spell came to an end after he sustained a calf problem, forcing him to return to Bramall Lane for medical treatment. He only had twenty minutes of game time with Millwall as substitutions against Doncaster Rovers and Leeds United. Montgomery still went on to make appearances as a Sheffield United player, including playing in the play-offs, in which the team lost to Huddersfield Town in the final at Wembley Stadium on penalties.

Central Coast Mariners
Montgomery ended his 12-year stay at Sheffield United by the cancellation of his contract through a mutual agreement on 31 August 2012. This allowed him to join United's sister club Central Coast Mariners in the Australian A-League.

He was a key part to the side that reached the 2013 A-League Grand Final but missed the grand final due to suspension. The Mariners went on to win 2–0. Montgomery was elected as vice-captain for the 2013–14 season, and made his debut as captain in a 1–0 win against rivals Sydney FC on 18 January 2014.

Wollongong Wolves
Montgomery signed for the National Premier Leagues NSW outfit Wollongong Wolves for 2017.

International career
Despite being born in Leeds, Montgomery is eligible to play for Scotland and featured for the Scotland U21 side in 2003. He made his debut in a 1–0 victory over Austria in April, and his second and last appearance in another 1–0 victory over Croatia in November. He subsequently appeared for a team of Scotland Futures in 2005, featuring in a 2–0 defeat of Poland in December.

Personal life 
Montgomery has a wife, Josie, and two twin daughters Leah and Chloe. Montgomery has a UEFA Pro coaching licence.

Career statistics

Managerial statistics

Honours
Central Coast Mariners
 A-League Championship: 2012–13

Individual
 Sheffield United F.C. Player of the Year: 2009–10
 A-League All Star: 2014

See also
 List of Central Coast Mariners FC players
 List of foreign A-League players
 List of Sheffield United F.C. players

References

External links
Nick Montgomery profile CCMariners.com.au

1981 births
Living people
Footballers from Leeds
English people of Scottish descent
Scottish emigrants to Australia
Scottish footballers
Scotland B international footballers
Scotland under-21 international footballers
Association football midfielders
Sheffield United F.C. players
Millwall F.C. players
Premier League players
English Football League players
Central Coast Mariners FC players
A-League Men players
Wollongong Wolves FC players
National Premier Leagues players
Naturalised soccer players of Australia
Central Coast Mariners FC non-playing staff
Expatriate soccer players in Australia